The Pearl Protectors is a youth-led marine conservation organisation. Established in 2018, The Pearl Protectors seek to reduce plastic pollution and conserve the marine environment through youth engagement, volunteerism, awareness and advocacy.

Projects

'Pearl Protector Approved' Accredited Standardisation Certificate 
The Pearl Protectors is known for the launching of the 'Pearl Protector Approved' Accredited Standardisation Certificate a certificate that for the first time recognises restaurants and food vendors in Sri Lanka that eliminate single-use plastic items based on three levels of commitments. The certificate has been adapted by Ranbath Organics and Café Kumbuk.

'Plastic Seabeds of Sri Lanka' documentary 
The Pearl Protectors produced a documentary on underwater plastic pollution.

Campaigns 
The Pearl Protectors advocates for policies to ban single-use plastic items, maintains a volunteer platform, constructs a Christmas tree annually out of discarded plastic bottles accumulated from beaches and displays it at Wellawatte Beach to highlight single-use plastic pollution, mobilizes volunteers to help cleanup efforts during maritime accidents like oil spills, host educational events, conducts school and public awareness sessions and workshops, carries out beach cleanups,  conducts advocacy research, advocates for Environmental Impact Assessments to be carried out for development projects and aquaculture in the coastal zone, volunteers to rescue stranded marine life, advocates against unethical fishing practices, collaborates with AIESEC Sri Lanka  for youth-engagement in marine environmental protection and promotes upcycling.

In the wake of the MV X-Press Pearl maritime disaster, The Pearl Protectors initiated the Nurdle Free Lanka campaign to mobilize volunteers to clean nurdles, educate the public and advocate for nurdle spills to be prevented at the source domestically with a petition.

References

See also 
The Pearl Protectors - Official website
World Oceans Day
World Cleanup Day

Conservation and environmental foundations
Environmental organisations based in Sri Lanka
Marine conservation organizations
Volunteer organizations
Advocacy groups
Nature conservation organisations based in Asia